The 1985 Pittsburgh Steelers season was the franchise's 53rd season as a professional sports franchise and as a member of the National Football League. The Steelers challenged for the AFC Central most of the season, sitting at 6–5 after their first eleven games. However, losing 4 out of their final 5 games dropped the Steelers to a 7–9 overall record, their first season with a losing record in fourteen years.

Personnel

Staff

Roster

Offseason

Preseason

Schedule

Regular season

Schedule

Week 1: vs. Indianapolis Colts

Week 2: at Cleveland Browns

Week 3: vs. Houston Oilers

Week 4: vs. Cincinnati Bengals

Week 5: at Miami Dolphins

Week 6: at Dallas Cowboys

Week 7: vs. St. Louis Cardinals

Week 8: at Cincinnati Bengals

Week 9: vs. Cleveland Browns

Week 10: at Kansas City Chiefs

Week 11: at Houston Oilers

Week 12: vs. Washington Redskins

Week 13: vs. Denver Broncos

Week 14: at San Diego Chargers

Week 15: vs. Buffalo Bills

Week 16: at New York Giants

Standings

References

External links
 1985 Pittsburgh Steelers season at Profootballreference.com 
 1985 Pittsburgh Steelers season statistics at jt-sw.com 

Pittsburgh Steelers seasons
Pittsburgh Steelers
Pittsburgh Steelers season